Metula aegrota is a species of sea snail, a marine gastropod mollusk in the family Colubrariidae.

Description

Distribution
This species occurs along Singapore.

References

 Kilburn R.N. (2004) The identities of Otitoma and Antimitra (Mollusca: Gastropoda: Conidae and Buccinidae). African Invertebrates 45: 263–270. NIZT 682 page(s): 269

External links

Colubrariidae
Gastropods described in 1845